The California High-Speed Rail Authority was established in 1996 after decades of advocacy for building a high speed rail system in California.  The passage of Proposition 1A in 2008, followed by the awarding of federal stimulus funds in 2010, established the initial funding for the California High-Speed Rail system.  Construction contracts began to be awarded in 2013, and the groundbreaking ceremony for initial construction was held on January 6, 2015.

Citing delays, cost overruns, and lack of transparency from the project's leadership, Governor Gavin Newsom reaffirmed the state's commitment to the project on February 12, 2019. Newsom said the state will prioritize the construction of a segment already underway in California's Central Valley, arguing it would revitalize the economically depressed region. The state will complete the planning for the remaining segments and seek federal funds for their construction. He also said he would replace the head of the state board that oversees the project and pledged more accountability for contractors that run over on costs.

Discussion of HSR alternatives 
Instead of risking the large expenditures of high-speed rail, some suggested that existing transportation methods should be increased to meet transportation needs. In a report commissioned by the Authority, a comparison was made to the needed infrastructure improvements if high-speed rail were not constructed.

In the 2023 Project Update Report, the cost of building equivalent capacity to the $88.5 to $127.9 billion
(YOE$) Phase 1 Blended plan was revised to $130 to $215 billion (YOE$) for about 4,200 more highway lane-miles, 91 more airport gates and two new airport runways.

Intending to undermine legislative support for the high-speed rail project, Elon Musk proposed Hyperloop as a replacement for HSR. Musk had previously criticized the high-speed rail project as being too expensive and not technologically advanced enough. However, Hyperloop is an unproven technology for its stated purpose. The entire route would be underground, requiring massive tunneling. There are also major issues concerning how it could be implemented in a large scale public transit system format. As of 2023 no Hyperloop system is in existence.

Legislative history 
Before 1992.
Governor Jerry Brown had long been an advocate of a high-speed rail system for California. In his first two terms as governor (1975–1983) he signed legislation into law for the study of a high-speed rail system. In 1992 in his run for the Presidency the United States  he continued to show his support for it. Then, in 1993 the Intercity High-Speed Rail Commission was created to conduct studies and prepare plans.

1992.
At the federal level, in 1992 the San Francisco–Los Angeles rail corridor was proposed in the Intermodal Surface Transportation Efficiency Act as one of five high speed rail corridors.

1996.
In 1996 the California High-Speed Rail Authority (CHSRA), was established by SB 1420 to begin formal planning in preparation for a ballot measure in 1998 or 2000. The ballot measure was originally scheduled to be put before voters in the 2004 general election; however, the state legislature voted twice to move it back, first to 2006, and finally to 2008 when 53% of voters approved the issuing of $9 billion in bonds for high speed rail in Proposition 1A.

2008.
The U.S. Congress enacted the Passenger Rail Investment and Improvement Act of 2008 (PRIIA), which among other things required the states to develop passenger rail plans. 

2013.
In May 2013, the California DOT released its 2013 State Rail Plan. This helped provide a new perspective that viewed the HSR project as the backbone of a statewide rail modernization plan. This has been used by the Authority in allocating funds to other state rail systems that support passenger rail goals and feed into the HSR system. The plan is being updated by DOT, with the latest revision in process of publication now.

2014.
In Jerry Brown's second two terms as Governor (2011 to 2019), in 2014 25% of California's Cap and Trade revenue was allocated to the HSR system. In 2017, this was extended into 2030.

2022.
SB 198 established the priority of bringing a working HSR line into operation as soon as possible.

Financial history
As of February 2022, $9.0 billion in funding had been spent, $2.7 billion of available funding remained, and at least a further $9.5 billion was estimated to be authorized. The total funding authorized for the project included:

 $3.5 billion in federal funds.
 $8.6 billion in Proposition 1A funds.
 $9.6-13.2 billion in total estimated Cap and Trade funds.

In July 2022, the remaining $4.2 billion in Proposition 1A funds were released to the authority.

Cost estimates 
The cost of the San Francisco-to-Anaheim route was originally estimated in 2008 at $ (in 2006 dollars; would be about $65 billion in year-of-expenditure (YOE) dollars). Upon further investigation, however, the Authority determined that a route using exclusive trackage along its entire length would be extremely expensive (estimated at over $96 billion in 2012 dollars), so they saw a need to share track in the metropolitan areas of the San Francisco Peninsula and the LA Basin. Thus, their perspective changed from a stand-alone High Speed Rail (HSR) system to one where HSR would share commuter rails (a "blended" system) to both save money and improve all passenger rail needs. (Note that the 2012 Revised Business Plan listed a new estimate for a Full Build option for a cumulative cost of $91.4 billion (2012 YOE) and completion date of 2033.)

The Revised 2012 Business Plan listed new estimates (in cumulative year-of-expenditure costs) for the new blended system: Initial Operating System in 2021 for a total of $31.3 billion, Bay to Basin in 2026 for a total of $51.2 billion, and Phase 1 Blended in 2028 for a total of $68.4 billion.

Phase 1 

Estimates for both time and costs have been steadily changing over the course of the project. The following table lists the cost estimates obtained from the California High Speed Rail Authority's business plans for the Phase 1 "Full" and "Blended" builds from San Francisco to Los Angeles. Note that the Authority realized early on that a "Full" system would financially infeasible, and so switched to the "Blended" plan.

Proposition 1A Bond funds 
On November 4, 2008, California voters approved Proposition 1A, a measure to construct the initial segment of the network. The measure authorized $9 billion in bond sales for the construction of the core segment between San Francisco and Los Angeles/Anaheim, and an additional $950 million for improvements on local railroad systems, which will serve as feeder systems to the planned high-speed rail system.

Federal funds 
On October 2, 2009, Governor Arnold Schwarzenegger unveiled California's official application for ARRA (the American Recovery and Reinvestment Act of 2009) high-speed rail stimulus funding. The total amount of the application was $4.7 billion, representing more than half of the federal $8 billion allocated for high-speed rail. On January 28, 2010, the White House announced that California would receive $2.35 billion of its request, of which $2.25 billion was allocated specifically for California High Speed Rail, while the rest was designated for conventional rail improvements. On October 28, 2010, the federal government awarded the Authority a further $900 million for passenger rail improvements, including $715 million specifically for the high-speed rail project, but with the requirement that it be used for the Central Valley segments from Merced to Fresno, or Fresno-to-Bakersfield. On December 9, 2010, the federal Department of Transportation reallocated $1.2 billion in high-speed rail funding from states that had rejected it. Of this, $624 million was redirected to the Authority for use on the Initial Construction Section. On May 9, 2011, the federal Department of Transportation reallocated an additional $2 billion in federal high-speed rail funding from Florida, which had rejected it. The DOT awarded $300 million to the Authority for a  extension from Madera north to the Chowchilla Wye.

Construction funding 
On July 6, 2012, the California legislature approved construction of high-speed system, and Governor Brown signed the bill on July 18. The funding approved includes $4.5 billion in bonds previously approved by voters, which, in turn, freed up $3.2 billion in federal funding that would otherwise have expired after July 6. $2.6 billion was allocated to build the Initial Construction Segment. Funding was also to be used for several "bookend" and connectivity projects designed to integrate the future high-speed rail system with existing local and regional rail lines. The plan estimates final cost at Year-Of-Expenditure (YOE) $68 billion for Phase 1.

Cap-and-Trade funds 

In June 2014 state legislators and Governor Jerry Brown agreed on apportioning the state's annual cap-and-trade funds (through 2030) so that 25% goes to high speed rail (under the authority of CHSRA) and 15% goes to other transportation projects by other agencies. As of September 2022, the project has received a total of $5,108,206,000 in cap-and-trade funding.

Future funding 
In May 2022, CHSRA applied for nearly $1.3 billion in federal funding from the 2021 Bipartisan Infrastructure Law as part of a multi-year plan to pursue additional federal funding. If awarded the  funds, the authority plans to use them to pursue the following goals:

 Constructing the second track for the initial operating segment between Merced and Bakersfield, beginning with the two tracks on the first 119 miles currently being built in the Central Valley.
 Advancing design work for the extensions to Merced and Bakersfield.
 Station development in Fresno and Kings/Tulare.
 Purchasing six fully electric train sets capable of speeds in excess of 200 mph.
 Advancing the next phase of design for two segments into the Bay Area (Merced to San Jose and San Jose to San Francisco) and into Southern California (Bakersfield to Palmdale and Burbank to Los Angeles).

In August 2022, the authority received a $25 million RAISE grant for advancing design work for the extension to Merced. The authority had applied for this grant prior to submitting its Multimodal Project Discretionary Grant applications in May 2022.

In addition, the authority is pursuing further funding opportunities in 2022, such as the Railroad Crossing Elimination Program, Consolidated Rail Infrastructure and Safety Improvement grants, and Federal-State Partnership grants.

Private sector interest 
In mid-2015 the CHSRA put out a request for Expressions of Interest from the private sector in financing, constructing, and operating the California HSR system. On Sept. 30, 2015 they released the names of 30 major and international firms who expressed interest in doing so. They were from all around the world, including major players in large construction projects, high-speed rail manufacturers, and HSR system operators. Europe, China, and Japan were represented.

Legal challenges

John Tos et al. (Proposition 1A compliance) 
The lawsuit John Tos, Aaron Fukuda, and the Kings County Board of Supervisors v. California High-Speed Rail Authority was first filed in late 2011. On November 25, 2013 Sacramento County Superior Court Judge Michael Kenny issued two rulings in this lawsuit concerning the release of funding from the passage of Proposition 1A. First, the state did not have a valid financing plan, and he ordered the Authority to rescind its business plan and create a new one. Second, he also ruled that the state had not properly approved the sale of bonds to finance the project. The Brown administration sought an expedited appellate court hearing, but that was denied. However, on July 31, 2014, the 3rd District Court of Appeals three-judge panel reversed the lower court ruling and ordered Judge Kenney to vacate his decision. The final ruling was that the requirements for the financing plan, environmental clearances, and construction plans did not need to be secured for the entire project before construction began, but only for each construction segment. Finally, in October 2014, the state Supreme Court refused to hear an appeal of this decision.

However, Judge Kenny split the aforementioned case into two parts, and the second part was continued to Feb. 11, 2016. The issues to be decided concerned other Proposition 1A legal requirements: (1) Can the train travel from Los Angeles (Union Station) to San Francisco (Transbay Terminal) in two hours and 40 minutes? (2) Will the train require an operational subsidy? (3) Does the new "blended system" approach meet the definition of high-speed rail in Proposition 1A? On Mar. 8, 2016 Judge Kenny ruled the issues raised were "not ripe for review". The plaintiffs raised compelling questions, but the Authority hasn't yet submitted its funding plan, and the project is still too much in flux. Thus, this case was ended, however, there is a possibility of further action on these issues in the future.

Also, on June 5, 2015, the Kings County Grand Jury released a report critical of the Kings County Board of Supervisors in pursuing this lawsuit. Three specific objections were noted: (1) no public hearings were held before litigation was started so public sentiment was not obtained, (2) grants that would have benefited the public were denied because the Board did not want to show any support for the HSR project, and (3) no county land would be affected by the project (except for road crossings), so the county was pursuing this suit for the benefit of individual property owners and not the public.

In November 2021 a state appeals court rejected the Tos lawsuit, effectively ending the litigation. Plaintiffs have little interest in appealing the issue to the state Supreme Court.

Other problems and lawsuits 
The lawsuit Kings County, Kern County, the First Free Will Baptist Church of Bakersfield, Dignity Health in Bakersfield, and the City of Shafter v. California High-Speed Rail Authority concerns the environmental certification and route selection of the Fresno to Bakersfield segment.

In TRANSDEF (Transportation Solutions Defense and Education Fund) v. the California Air Resources Board, the Authority is named as an affected party because it is the beneficiary of cap-and-trade fund allocations that are being challenged in the suit.

In Kings County, the Kings County Farm Bureau, Citizens for California High-Speed Rail Accountability, the Bay Area-based Community Coalition on High-Speed Rail, California Rail Foundation and TRANSDEF v. Surface Transportation Board, the litigants are challenging in the federal Ninth Circuit Court a ruling made in 2014 by the Surface Transportation Board that federal environmental laws trump state environmental laws. The Authority is intervening in this suit, and the outcome will directly affect the Authority.

Friends of Eel River vs. North Coast Railroad Authority is a lawsuit held before the California Supreme Court, and is similar to the Surface Transportation Board suit regarding the federal decision trumping the California Environmental Quality Act. Two state appellate courts have issued conflicting decisions on this issue. The Authority is filing a friend of the court brief, and the outcome will directly affect the Authority.

In December 2011, Legislative Analyst's Office published a report indicating that the incremental development path outlined by CHSRA may not be legal. According to the State Analyst, "Proposition 1A identifies certain requirements that must be met prior to requesting an appropriation of bond proceeds for construction. These include identifying for a corridor, or a usable segment thereof, all sources of committed funds, the anticipated time of receipt of those funds, and completing all project-level environmental clearances for that segment. Our review finds that the funding plan only identifies committed funding for the ICS (San Joaquin Valley segment), which is not a usable segment, and therefore does not meet the requirements of Proposition 1A. In addition, the HSRA has not yet completed all environmental clearances for any usable segment and will not likely receive all of these approvals prior to the expected 2012 date of initiating construction." However, initial concerns regarding the project's legality were resolved.

In November 2021, the Third District Court of Appeal in Sacramento affirmed a 2018 lower court ruling that the project's incremental development path did not violate the California Constitution.

"Dam Train"
In May 2015, Fresno City Councilman Steve Brandau used $3,000 of his campaign funds to put up billboards along state route 99 proposing that some of the rail funding be used to provide more water to farmers, such as the construction of the Temperance Flat Dam.  The words "Dam" and "Train" appear in large bold letters on the billboards.

While some officials agreed with Brandau, others like Fresno County Supervisor Henry Perea said they need both water and transportation.

References

California High-Speed Rail